Claude Rapin (born 19??) is an archaeologist and specialist of Central Asia, with special attention to Afghanistan and Uzbekistan.

Career 
Rapin studied archaeology, ancient history and Greek language at the University of Lausanne, where he obtained the degree of Doctor of Letters by writing a thesis on the royal treasury of the Hellenistic palace at Ai-Khanoum in Afghanistan, under the direction of Paul Bernard.

After a period of archaeological excavations in Europe (Great Britain, Romania and Switzerland), he began to concentrate his field activities on Central Asia, first in Afghanistan, then in Uzbekistan. He has participated in the excavations of Samarkand, Koktepe and Derbent relating to activities of the Franco-Uzbek Archaeological Mission of Sogdiana.

Since 1995, he has been a research fellow of the  team at CNRS in Paris; and gave courses on Central Asian archaeology as a privat-docent at University of Lausanne.

Selected publications 
 Articles
 Greeks in Afghanistan: Aï Khanum, 1990
 Nomads and the Shaping of Central Asia: From the Early Iron Age to the Kushan period, 2007
 With Svetlana Gorshenina, "Hellenism with or without Alexander the Great: Russian, Soviet and Central Asian approaches", article published in The Graeco-Bactrian and Indo-Greek World, edited by Rachel Mairs. Milton Park: Routledge, 2021.

 Books
 Fouilles d'Aï Khanoum VIII : La Trésorerie du palais hellénistique d'Aï Khanoum, Éditions de Boccard, 1992
 Indian Art from Afghanistan: The Legend of Śakuntalā and the Indian Treasure of Eucratides at Ai Khanum, Manohar Publishers, 1996
 With Svetlana Gorshenina, De Kaboul à Samarcande : Les archéologues en Asie centrale, coll. « Découvertes Gallimard » (nº 411), série Archéologie. Éditions Gallimard, 2001
 Samarcande : Cité mythique au coeur de l'Asie, coll. « Dossiers d'Archéologie » (nº 341). Éditions Faton, 2010

See also 
 Central Asian studies

References

External links 
  
 Publications de Claude Rapin at his official website 

Living people
Central Asian studies scholars
20th-century French archaeologists
21st-century French archaeologists
European writers in French
University of Lausanne alumni
Academic staff of the University of Lausanne
Year of birth missing (living people)